The Paleontological Institute, Russian Academy of Sciences (PIN) in Moscow is among the world's largest paleontological institutes. An affiliate of the Russian Academy of Sciences, it includes collections from all over the former Soviet Union, as well as from other countries.

== Museum ==

The Museum of Paleontology named after Yuri Alexandrovich Orlov is run by the institute, and contains public exhibits representing almost every type of fossil organism.  Particularly well represented are dinosaurs from Mongolia, therapsids from the Perm region of Russia, and Precambrian fossils from Siberia.

During World War II, the museum operated under a skeleton staff between 1941 and 1943 as the threat of the Battle of Moscow anticipated an invasion by the German army. Some specimens were packed up to prevent damage or destruction in air raids.

Notable staff 
 Evgeny Maleev
 Ivan Efremov
 Alexey Bystrow
 Tatiana Dobrolyubova
 Boris Sokolov
 Kirill Eskov
 Alexandr Rasnitsyn

References

External links

 Laboratory of Arthropods
 Paleontological Institute pages at the University of California Museum of Paleontology website

Paleontological research institutes
Institutes of the Russian Academy of Sciences
Research institutes in the Soviet Union
Scientific organizations established in 1930
Paleontology in Russia
1930 establishments in the Soviet Union